The Shire of Serpentine-Jarrahdale is a local government area in the outer southeastern metropolitan area of Perth, the capital of Western Australia, and has an area of  and a population of 32,173 as at the 2021 Census. The Shire's seat of government is the town of Mundijong.

History

The Serpentine-Jarrahdale Road District was established on 8 August 1913 with the amalgamation of the Serpentine Road District (1894) and Jarrahdale Road District (1902).

On 1 July 1961, it became a Shire following the passage of the Local Government Act 1960, which reformed all remaining road districts into shires. On 17 June 1977, it acquired Byford from Shire of Armadale–Kelmscott.

Wards
The Shire was previously split into four wards, named Byford, Central, North West and South.  Recently, the boundaries were realigned and on 29 July 2011, the gazetted boundaries became:

 North (4 councillors)
 North West (2 councillors)
 Southern (3 councillors)

Elections to fill all positions in these new wards were called for 15 October 2011. The latest council elections were held on 16 October 2021 and confirmed Michelle Rich as Shire President and Dave Atwell as her deputy.

Suburbs and towns
The suburbs, towns and localities of the Shire of Serpentine-Jarrahdale with population and size figures based on the most recent Australian census:

Population

 1911 populations were: Serpentine RD 328; Jarrahdale RD 1,126.
 The 1976 figure above, reported from the 1978 year book and 1981 census, is the figure after the addition of 1,634 residents living in Byford and nearby areas, which occurred in 1977.

Heritage-listed places

As of 2023, 108 places are heritage-listed in the Shire of Serpentine-Jarrahdale, of which five are on the State Register of Heritage Places.

References

External links
 
 ByfordWA: Local community website for the Byford area

Serpentine-Jarrahdale